The Hero of the Soviet Union was the highest distinction of the Soviet Union. It was awarded 12,775 times. Due to the large size of the list, it has been broken up into multiple pages.

 Malik Maharramov
 Mammad Maharramov
 Ghukas Madoyan
 Mikhail Mazan ru
 Yelena Mazanik
 Yegor Mazikin ru
 Gali Mazitov ru
 Yevdokim Mazkov ru
 Ivan Maznitsyn ru
 Yuri Mazny ru
 Trifon Mazur ru
 Aleksey Mazurenko (twice)
 Mikhail Mazurin ru
 Fyodor Mazurin ru
 Filipp Mazurov ru
 Ilya Mazuruk
 Vladimir Maiborsky ru
 Mark Maidan ru
 Nikolai Maidanov ru
 Nikolai Maikov ru
 Aleksandr Maiorov ru
 Aleksey Maiorov ru
 Dmitry Maisky ru
 Sakhip Maisky ru
 Boris Maistrenko ru
 Vladimir Maistrenko ru
 Georgy Maisyradze ru
 Tsakhau Makaev ru
 Aleksey Makalov ru
 Sergey Makarevich ru
 Aleksey Makarenko ru
 Nikolai Nikolayevich Makarenko ru
 Nikolai Fyodorovich Makarenko ru
 Timofey Makarenko ru
 Ivan Makarenkov ru
 Aleksey Makarov ru
 Andrey Makarov ru
 Arkady Makarov ru
 Valentin Makarov
 Vasily Iosifovich Makarov ru
 Vasily Markelovich Makarov ru
 Viktor Makarov ru
 Georgy Makarov ru
 Dmitry Makarov ru
 Zosim Makarov ru
 Ivan Ivanovich Makarov ru
 Ivan Konstantinovich Makarov ru
 Ivan Nikolaevich Makarov ru
 Konstantin Makarov ru
 Mikhail Andreyevich Makarov ru
 Mikhail Afanasevich Makarov ru
 Nikolai Makarov ru
 Oleg Makarov
 Pavel Makarov ru
 Pyotr Grigorievich Makarov ru
 Pyotr Fyodorovich Makarov ru
 Sergey Makarov ru
 Tatyana Makarova 
 Mikhail Makarychev ru
 Aleksey Makeyev ru
 Boris Makeyev ru
 Viktor Makeyev ru
 Yegor Makeyev ru
 Sergey Makeyev ru
 Ivan Makeyonok ru
 Leonid Makerov ru
 Aleksey Makienko ru
 Filipp Makitruk ru
 Fyodor Makovetsky ru
 Iosif Makovsky ru
 Spartak Makovsky
 Alikhan Makoev ru
 Aleksandr Makridin ru
 Nikolai Makridov ru
 Vladimir Maksakov ru
 Aleksandr Maksimenko ru
 Vasily Maksimenko ru
 Vladimir Maksimenko ru
 Ilya Maksimenko ru
 Sergey Maksimenko ru
 Iosif Maksimenya ru
 Pavel Maksimikhin ru
 Nikolai Maksimkin ru
 Aleksandr Maksimov ru
 Vladimir Maksimov ru
 Georgy Maksimov ru
 Ivan Maksimov ru
 Nikolai Vasilyevich Maksimov ru
 Nikolai Gordeyevich Maksimov ru
 Timofey Maksimov ru
 Yuri Maksimov ru
 Ivan Maksimcha ru
 Aleksey Maksin ru
 Ksenofont Maksin ru
 Ilya Maksyuta ru
 Sergey Maksyutov ru
 Nikolai Makukha ru
 Aleksey Malanov ru
 Boris Malakhov ru
 Nikolai Malakhov ru
 Yuri Malakhov ru
 Grigory Malashenkov ru
 Arseny Malen ru
 Georgy Malidovsky ru
 Mikhail Maliev ru
 Mikhail Malik ru
 Ilya Malikov ru
 Anatoly Malin ru
 Ivan Malin ru
 Konstantin Malin ru
 Mikhail Malinin
 Konstantin Malinka ru
 Vasily Malinovsky ru
 Mikhail Malinovsky ru
 Rodion Malinovsky (twice)
 Tsezar Malinovsky ru
 Anatoly Malikhov ru
 Ivan Malka ru
 Georgy Malkov ru
 Ivan Akimovich Malov ru
 Ivan Stepanovich Malov ru
 Mikhail Malov ru
 Oleg Malov ru
 Ivan Malozyomov ru
 Grigory Malonog ru
 Ivan Malofeyev ru
 Mitrofan Malushchenko ru
 Vasily Malygin ru
 Grigory Malygin ru
 Konstantin Malygin ru
 Sergey Malygin ru
 Sergey Maly ru
 Foma Malyk ru
 Yevgeny Malykh ru
 Aleksandr Malyshev ru
 Aleksey Malyshev ru
 Boris Malyshev ru
 Viktor Aleksandrovich Malyshev ru
 Viktor Fyodorovich Malyshev ru
 Ivan Afanasevich Malyshev ru
 Ivan Yermolaevich ru
 Mikhail Malyshev ru
 Nikolai Malyshev ru
 Pyotr Malyshev ru
 Fyodor Malyshev ru
 Yuri Malyshev
 Ivan Malko ru
 Aleksey Malkov ru
 Dmitry Malkov ru
 Ivan Maltsev ru
 Konstantin Maltsev ru
 Mikhail Maltsev ru
 Mikhail Malchenko ru
 Nikolai Malyuga ru
 Mikhail Malyarenko ru
 Viktor Malyasov ru
 Nikolai Mamaev ru
 Nikolai Mamay ru
 Demyan Mamatov ru
 Dmitry Mamatov ru
 Ami Mammadov
 Israfil Mammadov
 Gafur Mammadov
 Mammad Mammadov
 Khalil Mammadov
 Manshuk Mametova
 Aleksandr Maminov ru
 Vasily Mamistov ru
 Pavel Mamkin ru
 Nikolai Mamonov ru
 Nikolai Mamontov ru
 Martbek Mamraev ru
 Khadzhi-Umar Mamsurov ru
 Boris Mamutin ru
 Kosan Mamutov ru
 Ivan Managarov
 Mikhail Grigorievich Manakin ru
 Mikhail Fyodorovich Manakin ru
 Gennady Manakov
 Tikhon Manankov ru
 Musa Manarov
 Isak Manasyan ru
 Yevgeny Manakov ru
 Lidzhi Mandzhiev ru
 Yefim Mandrykin ru
 Mikhail Mandubura ru
 Lev Manevich ru
 Aleksandr Manin ru
 Arkhip Manita ru
 Valentin Mankevich ru
 Viktor Mankevich ru
 Stepan Mankovich ru
 Ildar Mannanov ru
 Ivan Manoilov ru
 Aleksandr Maokhin ru
 Konstantin Manoshin ru
 Mikhail Manturov ru
 Vasily Manuilov ru
 Akop Manukyan ru
 Andranik Manukyan ru
 Anatoly Marakasov ru
 Nikolai Marachevich ru
 Vasily Margelov
 David Margulis ru
 Lev Margulyan ru
 Mikhail Mardar ru
 Mikhail Marenkov ru
 Zinaida Mareseva
 Aleksey Maresyev
 Yevgeny Mariinsky ru
 Ivan Marikov ru
 Tatyana Marinenko
 Aleksandr Marinesko
 Viktor Marinin ru
 Nikolai Marinin ru
 Ivan Marinsky ru
 Nikolai Marinchenko ru
 Ivan Marinych ru
 Nikolai Maritsky ru
 Vasily Marichev ru
 Vladimir Markanov ru
 Vladimir Markelov ru
 Nikolai Grigorievich Markelov ru
 Nikolai Danilovich Markelov ru
 Nikolai Stepanovich Markelov ru
 Andrey Markin ru
 Vyacheslav Markin ru
 Iosif Markin ru
 Nikolai Vasilyevich Markin ru
 Nikolai Petrovich Markin ru
 Sergey Markin ru
 Fyodor Markin ru
 Aleksandr Markov ru
 Aleksey Vasilyevich Markov ru
 Aleksey Ivanovich Markov ru
 Anatoly Markov ru
 Vasily Markov ru
 Viktor Markov ru
 Vladimir Markov ru
 Ivan Markov ru
 Nikifor Markov ru
 Pyotr Markov ru
 Fyodor Markov ru
 Veniamin Markovsky ru
 Stepan Markovtsev ru
 Pavel Markutsa ru
 Mikhail Marmulyov ru
 Vasily Martekhov ru
 Sarkis Martirosyan
 Mikhail Martusenko ru
 Vladimir Martysenko ru
 Ivan Nazarovich Martynenko ru
 Ivan Pavlovich Martynenko ru
 Mikhail Martynenko ru
 Aleksandr Vasilyevich Martynov ru
 Aleksandr Maksimovich Martynov ru
 Aleksey Martynov ru
 Vladimir Martynov ru
 Dmitry Martynov ru
 Yevgeny Martynov ru
 Ivan Alekseyevich Martynov ru
 Ivan Petrovich Martynov ru
 Ivan Stepanovich Martynov ru
 Mikhail Martynov ru
 Moisey Martynov ru
 Nikolai Martynov ru
 Yakov Martynov ru
 Sergey Martyshin ru
 Nikolai Martyanov ru
 Anatoly Marunov ru
 Pavel Marunchenko ru
 Konstantin Marusichenko ru
 Nikolai Marushin ru
 Vasily Marfitsin ru
 Mikhail Markheyev ru
 Vladimir Martsinkevich ru
 Alekseu Martsinkovsky ru
 Aleksandr Marchenko ru
 Ivan Marchenko ru
 Fyodor Marchenko ru
 Anatoly Marchenkov ru
 Mark Marchenkov ru
 Mikhail Marchuk ru
 Pyotr Marchuk ru
 Nikolai Marchukov ru
 Ivan Marin ru
 Moisey Maryanovsky ru
 Pyotr Maryasov ru
 Pyotr Maryutin ru
 Aslangeri Masaev ru
 Temir Masin ru
 Viktor Masich ru
 Mikhail Maskaev ru
 Ivan Maslakov ru
 Vitaly Maslennikov ru
 Ivan Maslennikov
 Nikolai Maslennikov ru
 Pyotr Maslennikov ru
 Anton Maslikov ru
 Aleksandr Maslov ru
 Anatoly Maslov ru
 Vasily Ivanovich Maslov ru
 Vasily Timofeyevich Maslov ru
 Vladimir Maslov ru
 Ivan Vasilyevich Maslov (soldier) ru
 Ivan Vasilyevich Maslov (pilot)
 Ilya Maslov ru
 Mikhail Maslov ru
 Nikolai Maslov ru
 Anna Maslovskaya
 Ivan Maslovsky ru
 Georgy Maslyakov ru
 Aleksey Masnev ru
 Vladimir Massalsky ru
 Nikolai Massonov ru
 Aleksandr Masterkov ru
 Nikolai Mastryukov ru
 Ivan Masychev ru
 Vasily Matakov ru
 Vasily Matasov ru
 Aleksandr Vasilyevich Matveyev ru
 Aleksandr Vladimirovich Matveyev ru
 Aleksey Matveyev ru
 Vladimir Ivanovich Matveyev (pilot) ru
 Vladimir Ivanovich Matveyev (soldier) ru
 Vladimir Sergeyevich Matveyev ru
 Ivan Yefimovich Matveyev ru
 Ivan Stepanovich Matveyev ru
 Ivan Fyodorovich Matveyev ru
 Mikhail Matveyev ru
 Nikolai Panteleyevich Matveyev ru
 Nikolai Stepanovich Matveyev ru
 Oleg Matveyev ru
 Pavel Konstantinovich Matveyev ru
 Pavel Yakovlevich Matveyev ru
 Fyodor Matveyev ru
 Yakov Matveyev ru
 Ivan Matveyenko ru
 Ivan Matveitsev ru
 Andrey Matvienko ru
 Nikolai Matvienko ru
 Nikolai Materienko ru
 Pyotr Matienko ru
 Aleksandr Matikov ru
 Yemelyan Matlaev ru
 Vasily Matronin ru
 Aleksandr Alekseyevich Matrosov ru
 Alexander Matveyevich Matrosov
 Aleksey Matrosov ru
 Vadim Matrosov ru
 Iosif Matrunchik ru
 Klim Matuzov ru
 Lev Matushkin ru
 Ivan Matyugin ru
 Arsenty Matyuk ru
 Mikhail Matyunin ru
 Pavel Matyuk ru
 Grigoru Matyukhin ru
 Aleksey Matyushev ru
 Vasily Matyushkin ru
 Pyotr Matyushchenko ru
 Nikolai Matyashin ru
 Aleksey Makhalin ru
 Vladimir Makhalin ru
 Sergey Makhalov ru
 Maksim Makhanyov ru
 Pavel Makhinya ru
 Jura Makhmudov ru
 Rojan Makhmudov ru
 Aleksey Makhnyov ru
 Nikolai Makhov ru
 Ivan Makhorin ru
 Ivan Makhota ru
 Boris Makhotin ru
 Grigory Makhrinov ru
 Aleksey Makhrov ru
 Grigory Mats ru
 Ivan Matsak ru
 Sergey Matsapura ru
 Vasily Matsievich ru
 Ignaty Matskevich ru
 Pyotr Matsygin ru
 Mikhail Machin ru
 Afanasy Machnev ru
 Anton Machlenko ru
 Toman Machulsky ru
 Aleksandr Mashakov ru
 Grigory Mashanin ru
 Pyotr Masherov
 Mitrofan Mashin ru
 Mikhail Mashintsev ru
 Ivan Mashir ru
 Ivan Mashkarin ru
 Shabsa Mashkautsan ru
 Aleksey Mashkov ru
 Igor Mashkov ru
 Nikolai Mashkov ru
 Roman Mashkov
 Stepan Mashkovsky ru
 Boris Mashkovtsev ru
 Pavel Mashtakov ru
 Ivan Mayurov ru
 Aleksey Mayakin ru
 Karl Mebagishvili ru
 Mikhail Mebsh ru
 Pavel Meger ru
 Aleksandr Yegorovich Medvedev ru
 Aleksandr Ivanovich Medvedev ru
 Aleksandr Nikolayevich Medvedev ru
 Viktor Aleksandrovich Medvedev ru
 Viktor Ivanovich Medvedev ru
 Gavriil Medvedev ru
 Dmitry Aleksandrovich Medvedev ru
 Dmitry Nikolayevich Medvedev
 Ivan Petrovich Medvedev ru
 Ilya Medvedev ru
 Mikhail Medvedev ru
 Nikolai Medvedev ru
 Sergey Medvedev ru
 Ivan Medved ru
 Nikolai Medvetsky ru
 Nikolai Medin ru
 Vyacheslav Mednonogov ru
 Mikhail Medyakov ru
 Ivan Meilus ru
 Natalya Meklin
 Yefim Melakh ru
 Nikolai Melashenko ru
 Nikolai Melashchenko ru
 Vasily Melezhik ru
 Aleksandr Melentev ru
 Mariya Melentyeva
 Arutyun Meletyan ru
 Oleg Meleshkov ru
 Khachatur Melikyan ru
 Andrey Melkonyan ru
 Vasily Melnik ru
 Nikhail Melnik ru
 Mykola Melnyk
 Nikolai Melnik ru
 Maryte Melnikaite
 Aleksandr Melnikov ru
 Aleksey Dmitrievich Melnikov ru
 Aleksey Ivanovich Melnikov ru
 Anatoly Vasilyevich Melnikov (1922—2001) ru
 Anatoly Vasilyevich Melnikov (1923—1944) ru
 Anatoly Ivanovich Melnikov ru
 Andrey Aleksandrovich Melnikov
 Andrey Iosifovich Melnikov ru
 Boris  Melnikov ru
 Vasily Yemelyanovich  Melnikov ru
 Vasily Ivanovich Melnikov ru
 Viktor Melnikov ru
 Ivan Melnikov ru
 Nikolai Mirillovich Melnikov ru
 Nikolai Nikiforovich Melnikov ru
 Nikolai Pavlovich Melnikov ru
 Pyotr Melnikov ru
 Semyon Alekseyevich Melnikov ru
 Semyon Ivanovich Melnikov ru
 Sergey Melnikov ru
 Fyodor Melnikov ru
 Ivan Melnichenko ru
 Sergey Melnichenko ru
 Ivan Melnov ru
 Vasily Melyakov ru
 Valery Menitsky ru
 Grigory Menshun ru
 Yevgeny Menshutin ru
 Aleksandr Menshikov ru
 Anatoly Menshikov ru
 Leonid Menshikov ru
 Pyotr Menshikov ru
 Afanasy Menshchikov ru
 Vladimir Mergasov ru
 Viktor Merenkov ru
 Pyotr Merenkov ru
 Andrey Merenyashev ru
 Kirill Meretskov
 Luka Mereshko ru
 Ivan Merzlyak ru
 Arnold Meri
 Ramón Mercader
 Garri Merkviladze ru
 David Merkviladze ru
 Vladimir Merkulov ru
 Georgy Merkulov ru
 Ivan Danilovich Merkulov ru
 Ivan Petrovich Merkulov ru
 Matvey Merkulov ru
 Serafim Merkulov ru
 Valerian Merkurev ru
 Nikolai Merkurev ru
 Aleksandr Merkushev ru
 Vasily Merkushev ru
 Ivan Merkushev ru
 Vasily Merchansky ru
 Vasily Matelyov ru
 Akim Metyashkin ru
 Kirill Makhanoshin ru
 Fyodor Mekhnin ru
 Ilya Meshakov ru
 Vasily Meshkov ru
 Ivan Andreyevich Meshkov ru
 Ivan Georgievich Meshkov ru
 Mikhail Meshcheryagin ru
 Georgy Meshcheryakov ru
 Ivan Meshcheryakov ru
 Mikhail Meshcheryakov
 Pavel Meshcheryakov ru
 Andrey Migal ru
 Valery Migunov ru
 Vasily Migunov ru
 Nester Mizerny ru
 Mikhail Mizinov ru
 Gedeon Mikaelyan ru
 Gennady Mikley ru
 Stepan Mikoyan ru
 Vitaly Mikryukov ru
 Boris Mikutsky ru
 Sergey Milashenkov ru
 Konstantin Milashin ru
 Maksim Milevsky ru
 Ivan Milenky ru
 Veniamin Miletsky ru
 Pyotr Miller ru
 Pavel Milov ru
 Aleksey Milovanov ru
 Andrey Milovanov ru
 Vasily Milovatsky ru
 Vadim Milovidov ru
 Hajimurza Mildzihov ru
 Erich Mielke
 Rafail Milner ru
 Semyon Milchenko ru
 Aleksandr Milyukov ru
 Vladimir Milyukov ru
 Andrey Milyutin ru
 Aleksandr Min
 Nikolai Minaev ru
 Ivan Minaenko ru
 Vasily Minakov
 Ivan Minakov ru
 Nabijan Minbav ru
 Dmitry Mineyev ru
 Leonid Minenko ru
 Vasily Minenkov ru
 Nurly Minuakhmetov ru
 Aleksandr Minin ru
 Fyodor Minin ru
 Yakov Minin ru
 Frants Minkevich ru
 Gumer Minnibaev ru
 Taftizan Minnigulov ru
 Dmitry Minchgov ru
 Nikolai Miokov ru
 Semyon Mirvoda ru
 Ivan Mirenkov ru
 Tokhtasin Mirzayev ru
 Bahatdin Mirzayev
 Yevgeny Mirkovsky ru
 Anatoly Mirovich ru
 Vasily Mirolyubov ru
 Yuri Mirolyubov ru
 Aleksandr Alekseyevich Mironenko ru
 Aleksandr Grigorievich Mironenko
 Aleksey Mironenko ru
 Viktor Mironenko ru
 Iosif Mironenko ru
 Aleksandr Mironov ru
 Aleksey Afanasevich Mironov ru
 Aleksey Nikolayevich Mironov ru
 Filipp Mironov ru
 Grigory Mironov ru
 Leonid Mironov ru
 Mikhail Mironov ru
 Pavel Andreyevich Mironov ru
 Pavel Vasilyevich Mironov
 Pyotr Mironov ru
 Sergey Mironov ru
 Valentin Mironov ru
 Vasily Mironov ru
 Veniamin Mironov ru
 Viktor Mironov ru
 Vladimir Mironov ru
 Andrey Miroshnik ru
 Mikhail Miroshnik ru
 Ivan Miroshnikov ru
 Aleksey Miroshnichenko ru
 Anatoly Miroshnichenko ru
 Viktor Miroshnichenko ru
 Dmitry Miroshnichenko ru
 Ivan Miroshnichenko ru
 Nikolai Miroshnichenko ru
 Pyotr Miroshnichenko ru
 Sergey Miroshnichenko ru
 Andrey Mirskov ru
 Vasily Mirun ru
 Gavriil Mitin ru
 Viktor Mitrakov ru
 Ivan Mitrofanenkov ru
 Vasily Mitrofanov
 Nikolai Mitrofanov ru
 Fyodor Mitrofanov ru
 Vasily Mitrokhin ru
 Vasily Mitrokhov ru
 Vasily Mitroshin ru
 Pavel Mitroshin ru
 Vladimir Mitryagin ru
 Vladimir Mitryaev ru
 Aleksey Mitryakov ru
 Sergey Mitt ru
 Nikita Mitchenko ru
 Boris Mitkin ru
 Nikolai Mikhailenko ru
 Vasily Mikhailenko ru
 Yevgeny Mikhailenko ru
 Ivan Mikhailenko ru
 Yakov Mikhailik ru
 Anton Mikhailichenko ru
 Ivan Mikhailichenko (twice)
 Mikhail Mikhailichenko ru
 Pavel Mikhailichenko ru
 Aleksandr Borisovich Mikhailov ru
 Aleksandr Fadeyevich Mikhailov ru
 Aleksandr Yakovlevich Mikhailov ru
 Andrey Mikhailov ru
 Boris Mikhailov ru
 Vasily Vasilyevich Mikhailov ru
 Vasily Mikhailovich Mikhailov ru
 Vasily Nikolayevich Mikhailov ru
 Vladimir Aleksandrovich Mikhailov ru
 Vladimir Alekseyevich Mikhailov ru
 Vladimir Andreyevich Mikhailov ru
 Vladimir Stepanovich Mikhailov ru
 Grigory Mikhailov ru
 Yevgeny Vitalevich Mikhailov ru
 Yevgeny Ivanovich Mikhailov ru
 Leonid Mikhailov ru
 Mikhail Mikhailov ru
 Nikolai Ivanovich Mikhailov ru
 Nikolai Lavrentevich Mikhailov ru
 Nikolai Matveyevich Mikhailov ru
 Pavel Mikhailov ru
 Polikarp Mikhailov ru
 Terenty Mikhailov ru
 Fyodor Mikhailov ru
 Yekaterina Mikhailova-Demina
 Arkady Mikhailovsky ru
 Yemelyan Mikhailyuk ru
 Boris Mikhalyov ru
 Vasily Mikhalyov
 Vladimir Mikhalyov ru
 Konstantin Mikhalenko ru
 Yefim Mikhalenkov ru
 Pyotr Mikhalitsyn ru
 Vasily Mikhalko ru
 Vasily Mikhalkov ru
 Mikhail Mikhalkov ru
 Vasily Mikhalchenko ru
 Vladimir Mikheyev ru
 Grigory Mikheyev ru
 Mikhail Mikheyev ru
 Nikolai Mikheyev ru
 Pavel Mikheyev ru
 Aleksey Mikhin ru
 Mikhail Ivanovich Mikhin
 Mikhail Nikolayevich Mikhin ru
 Stepan Mikhlyaev ru
 Gavriil Mikhnev ru
 Nikolai Mikhno ru
 Mikhail Mikhutkin ru
 Vasily Michurin ru
 Nikolai Mishanov ru
 Viktor Mishenin ru
 Nikolai Mishenin ru
 Aleksandr Mishin ru
 Aleksey Mishin ru
 Yevgeny Mishin ru
 Ivan Mishin ru
 Ivan Mishin ru
 Nikolai Mishkin ru
 Vasily Mishulin ru
 Vasily Mishustin ru
 Aleksey Dmitrievich Mishchenko ru
 Aleksey Yemelyanovich Mishchenko ru
 Ivan Vasilyevich Mishchenko (1906—1944) ru
 Ivan Vasilyevich Mishchenko (1922—1987) ru
 Samson Mkrtumov ru
 Arutyun Mkrtchyan ru
 Semyon Mladaentsev ru
 Aleksandr Mnatsakanov ru
 Mikhail Mnyshenko ru
 Mikhail Mogilny ru
 Ivan Mogilchak ru
 Boris Modin ru
 Nikolai Mozhaev ru
 Pavel Mozheiko ru
 Filipp Mozhenko ru
 Ivan Mozhievsky ru
 Aleksey Mozgalyov ru
 Ivan Mosgovoy ru
 Ivan Mozzharov ru
 Stepan Mozzherin ru
 Aleksandr Moiseyev ru
 Ivan Grigorievich Moiseyev ru
 Ivan Timofeyevich Moiseyev ru
 Nikolai Matveyevich Moiseyev ru
 Nikolai Semyonovich Moiseyev ru
 Oleg Moiseyev ru
 Alexander Moiseyevsky
 Anatoly Moiseyenko ru
 Vasily Moiseyenko ru
 Vladimir Moiseyenko ru
 Grigory Yakovlevich Moiseyenko ru
 Grigory Petrovich Moiseyenko ru
 Yevgeny Moizykh ru
 Aleksey Mokrinsky ru
 Ivan Mokrousov
 Nikolai Mokry ru
 Pyotr Moksin ru
 Erezhepbai Moldabaev ru
 Zhangas Moldagaliev ru
 Aliya Moldagulova
 Aleksandr Molev ru
 Nikolai Molev ru
 Mikhail Molodikov ru
 German Molodov ru
 Vladimir Molodtsov ru
 Dmitry Molodtsov ru
 Alexander Molodchy (twice)
 Vladimir Molodchikov ru
 Aleksey Molodchinin ru
 Pavel Molodykh ru
 Viktor Molozev ru
 Vasily Molokov
 Ivan Molokov ru
 Konstantin Molonenkov ru
 Vladimir Molotkov ru
 Grigory Molochinsky ru
 Grigory Molochkov ru
 Nikolai Molochnikov ru
 Aleksey Molchanov ru
 Vasily Molchanov ru
 Gleb Molchanov ru
 Yevgeny Molchanov ru
 Nikolai Molchanov ru
 Abdul Ahad Mohmand
 Bauyrzhan Momyshuly
 Mefody Monchak ru
 Bek Morgoev ru
 Nikolai Morgun ru
 Vladimir Morgunenko ru
 Sergey Morgunov
 Yuri Morgunov ru
 Nikolai Mordakin ru
 Ivan Mordasov ru
 Sergey Mordvintsev ru
 Mikhail Mordvyannikov ru
 Vasily Mordin ru
 Nikolai Morev ru
 Fyodor Morin ru
 Mikhail Morkovin ru
 Aksenty Moroz ru
 Daniil Moroz ru
 Yevgeny Moroz ru
 Ivan Mikhailovich Moroz ru
 Ivan Nikolayevich Moroz ru
 Nikolai Moroz ru
 Terenty Moroz ru
 Mikhail Morozenko ru
 Anatoly Morozov
 Arseny Morozov ru
 Vasily Mikhailovich Morozov ru
 Vasily Pavlovich Morozov ru
 Vasily Fyodorovich Morozov (lieutenant colonel) ru
 Vasily Fyodorovich Morozov (colonel) ru
 Vladimir Denisovich Morozov ru
 Georgy Morozov
 Grigory Morozov ru
 Dmitry Morozov ru
 Yevgeny Morozov ru
 Ivan Aleksandrovich Morozov ru
 Ivan Vasilyevich Morozov ru
 Ivan Dmitrievich Morozov ru
 Ivan Ivanovich Morozov (1913—1965) ru
 Ivan Ivanovich Morozov (1913—1997) ru
 Ivan Ivanovich Morozov (1922—2003) ru
 Ivan Konstantinovich Morozov ru
 Ivan Fyodorovich Morozov ru
 Konstantin Morozov ru
 Lavrenty Morozov ru
 Mikhail Ilyich Morozov ru
 Mikhail Nazarovich Morozov ru
 Nikolai Morozov ru
 Pavel Morozov ru
 Pyotr Andreyevich Morozov ru
 Pyotr Ivanovich Morozov ru
 Semyon Morozov
 Sergey Morozov ru
 Timofey Morozov ru
 Foty Morozov ru
 Anna Morozova
 Aleksandr Morukhov ru
 Pyotr Mosienko ru
 Sergey Mosienko ru
 Ivan Mosin ru
 Pyotr Mosin ru
 Georgy Moskalyov ru
 Dmitry Moskalyov ru
 Nikolai Moskalyov ru
 Georgy Moskalenko ru
 Ivan Vasilyevich Moskalenko ru
 Ivan Yefimovich Moskalenko ru
 Kirill Moskalenko (twice)
 Mikhail Moskalenko ru
 Yakov Moskalenko ru
 Grigory Moskalchuk ru
 Nikita Moskalchuk ru
 Vasily Moskvin ru
 Viktor Moskvin ru
 Mikhail Moskvin ru
 Viktor Moskvinchyov ru
 Nikolai Moskvichenko ru
 Aleksandr Moskinsky ru
 Vasily Moskovenko ru
 Aleksandr Moskovsky ru
 Grigory Moskovchenko ru
 Aleksandr Mosolov ru
 Anatoly Mosolov ru
 Georgy Mosolov
 Vladimir Mostovoy ru
 Grigory Mostovoy ru
 Nikolai Mostovoy ru
 Sergey Mostovoy
 Pore Mosulishvili
 Ilya Mospanov ru
 Ivan Motin ru
 Pyotr Motkov ru
 Nikolai Motorin ru
 Ivan Motorny ru
 Vasily Motorygin ru
 Ivan Motuz ru
 Fyodor Mokhlaev ru
 Konstantin Mokhov ru
 Mikhail Mokhov ru
 Sergey Mokhovoy ru
 Nikolai Mochalin ru
 Vladimir Mochalov ru
 Mikhail Mochalov ru
 Leonid Mochenkov ru
 Aleksandr Moshin ru
 Aleksandr Moshkin ru
 Boris Moshkov ru
 Ivan Moshlyak
 Pavel Mugalyov ru
 Valentin Mudretsov ru
 Nikolai Muzhailo ru
 Pavel Muzhitsky ru
 Ivan Muzalyov ru
 Mikhail Muzolyov ru
 Vasily Muzykin ru
 Mikhail Muzykin ru
 Nikolai Multan ru
 Luka Muravitsky ru
 Nikolai Muravlyov ru
 Aleksey Muravyov ru
 Mikhail Muravyov ru
 Nikolai Andreyevich Muravyov ru
 Nikolai Savelevich Muravyov ru
 Pavel Muravyov ru
 Bedir Muradov ru
 Andranik Muradyan ru
 Pavel Murakhtov ru
 Aleksey Murashev ru
 Mikhail Murashkin ru
 Yakov Murashkin ru
 Pavel Murashov ru
 Aleksandr Murdugov ru
 Ilya Murza ru
 Stepan Murza ru
 Gazis Murzagalimov ru
 Gallyam Murzakhanov ru
 Ibragim Murzin ru
 Stepan Murugov ru
 Pavel Murygin ru
 Mardan Musayev
 Mukat Musayev ru
 Saadil Musayev ru
 Valentin Musatov ru
 Ilya Musatov ru
 Nikolai Musatov ru
 Ivan Musienko ru
 Vasily Musin ru
 Nikolai Musinsky ru
 Grigory Muslanov ru
 Aleksandr Muslanov ru
 Zainulla Mustakimov ru
 Bakir Mustafayev
 Khydyr Mustafayev
 Mikhail Mustafin ru
 Serikbai Mutkenov ru
 Grigory Mukha ru
 Hamza Mukhamadiev ru
 Zhakipbek Mykhambetov ru
 Khavazi Muhamed-Mirzaev
 Anatoly Mukhin ru
 Valentin Mukhin ru
 Vasily Dmitrievich Mukhin ru
 Vasily Filippovich Mukhin ru
 Viktor Mukhin ru
 Sergey Mukhortov ru
 Vladimir Mushnikov ru
 Georgy Mushnikov ru
 Vladimir Myza ru
 Stepan Mykal ru
 Vladimir Mylnikov ru
 Georgy Mylnikov ru
 Grigory Mylnikov (twice)
 Aleksandr Mysin ru
 Viktor Mysnicheko ru
 Ivan Mytarev ru
 Dmitry Mytov ru
 Vasily Mykhlik (twice)
 Vasily Mytsyk ru
 Ivan Mychko ru
 Mikhail Myagky ru
 Vladimir Myagkob ru
 Anatoly Myagchilov ru
 Mikhail Myadzel ru
 Ivan Myakishev ru
 Vasily Myakotin ru
 Ivan Myakotin ru
 Gennady Myashin ru
 Aleksandr Myasnikov ru
 Vladimir Myasnikov ru
 Yevgeny Myasnikov ru
 Ivan Myasnikov ru
 Mikhail Myasnikov ru
 Viktor Myasnitsin ru
 Grigory Myasoedov ru
 Vasily Myachin

References 

Russian Ministry of Defence Database «Подвиг Народа в Великой Отечественной войне 1941—1945 гг.» [Feat of the People in the Great Patriotic War 1941-1945] (in Russian).

Lists of Heroes of the Soviet Union